Network Aviation is an airline based at Perth Airport, operating regular scheduled and air charter services in support of "fly-in fly-out" mining operations throughout Western Australia. In partnership with subsidiary engineering provider Network Turbine Solutions, Network Aviation operates over 50 flights a week on behalf of mining companies to facilitate crew changes at remote sites.

History

After assisting to establish Skippers Aviation, Lindsay Evans founded Network in 1998. Originally operating a mix of smaller aircraft types such as Cessna 441 Conquest IIs, Cessna 310s and Beechcraft Super King Airs, in partnership with key clients Network grew into larger types and commenced operating Embraer Brasilias in 2000 and Fokker 100s in 2008.

In February 2011, Network Aviation was purchased by Qantas. Network retains its current management, employees and operating structure, with the business to be aligned with Qantas' operations, standards and processes. With the purchase, Qantas stated it was looking at significantly growing Network's fleet and operations. On taking over Network, Qantas announced that it was purchasing ten Fokker 100 aircraft for the company.

In May 2014 Network Aviation received approval to operate three weekly services from Perth to Exmouth, Western Australia with Fokker 100s.

In March 2015 QantasLink ceased its scheduled turboprop aircraft operations in Western Australia. Network Aviation took over services to Geraldton and some services to Exmouth. On 31 July 2015, Qantas announced that the Fokker 100 aircraft would be progressively repainted in QantasLink colours.

In September 2016 Network Aviation became an affiliate member of the oneworld airline alliance.

Destinations
Network Aviation operates regular services to fixed schedules from Perth Airport to the following destinations in Western Australia:. The airline also operates a number of charters to select destinations to facilitate "Fly-In, Fly-Out" working rosters on mining sites.

Northern Territory
Darwin

Western Australia
Gascoyne region
DeGrussa copper mine
Exmouth (Learmonth Airport)
Goldfields–Esperance region
Carosue Dam
Kalgoorlie
Kimberley region
Broome
Koolan Island
Mid West region
Geraldton
Pilbara region
Boolgeeda
Christmas Creek mine
Buttbreak iron ore mine
Iron Bridge mine
Eliwana mine
Karratha
Newman
Onslow, WA
Paraburdoo
Port Hedland
Roy Hill Mine (Ginbata Airport)
Solomon Hub iron ore mine
Wodgina mine
West Angelas mine
South West region
Busselton

Fleet

Current fleet
As of January 2022 the Network Aviation fleet consists of the following aircraft:

Formerly operated
Network Aviation formerly also operated the following types of aircraft:

 Beechcraft 200 Super King Air
 Cessna 310
 Cessna 441 Conquest II
 Embraer EMB-120ER Brasilia

See also
List of airlines of Australia

References

External links

Network Aviation
Network Becomes QantasLink

Airlines established in 1998
Australian companies established in 1998
Airlines of Western Australia
Qantas
Charter airlines of Australia
Companies based in Perth, Western Australia